The 1918 Arkansas Razorbacks football team represented the University of Arkansas in the Southwest Conference (SWC) during the 1918 college football season. In their second and final year under head coach Norman C. Paine, the Razorbacks compiled a 3–2 record (0–1 against SWC opponents), finished in seventh place out of eight teams in the SWC, and were outscored by their opponents by a combined total of 121 to 41.  The Razorbacks also sustained the worst defeat in the program's history losing to Oklahoma by a 103 to 0 score.

Schedule

References

Arkansas
Arkansas Razorbacks football seasons
Arkansas Razorbacks football